Lernakert is a village in the Martuni Municipality of the Gegharkunik Province of Armenia.

References 

Populated places in Gegharkunik Province